Village is a Metrolink tram stop built as part of the line to the Trafford Centre, within the Trafford Park Village area of Trafford. Specifically, the stop is located on Ashburton Road East. It opened on 22 March 2020.

Services
From this stop a service runs generally every 12 minutes towards Cornbrook and towards the Trafford Centre.

References

Railway stations in Great Britain opened in 2020
Tram stops in Trafford